Porto Mosquito is a settlement in the southern part of the island of Santiago, Cape Verde. It is situated on the south coast, 10 km northwest of Cidade Velha. It is part of the municipality of Ribeira Grande de Santiago.

References

Villages and settlements in Santiago, Cape Verde
Populated coastal places in Cape Verde
Ribeira Grande de Santiago